Oscar Edegardo Gómez (born July 21, 1975) is a retired male light-middleweight boxer from Argentina, who represented his native country at the 1996 Summer Olympics in Atlanta, Georgia. There he was defeated in the first round of the men's light-middleweight division (– 71 kg) by Uzbekistan's eventual bronze medalist Karim Tulaganov after the referee stopped the contest in the third round.

References
 sports-reference

1975 births
Living people
Light-middleweight boxers
Boxers at the 1996 Summer Olympics
Olympic boxers of Argentina
Argentine male boxers